Rogge is a German and Dutch surname. It originates from the word rogge, meaning rye, and referring to a grower, baker or merchant of rye or rye bread. it may also be derived from a short version of the given name Roger. Notable people with the surname include:

Bernhard Rogge (1899–1982), German naval officer
Benjamin A. Rogge (1920–1980), American economist
Bente Rogge (born 1997), Dutch water polo player
Bette Rogge (1922–2015), American radio and television presenter, talk show host and journalist
Clint Rogge (1889–1969), American baseball player
Élodie Rogge-Dietrich (born 1983), New Caledonian-French tennis player
George Rogge (1907–1997), American football player
Herbert Rogge (born 1947), West German handball player
Jacques Rogge (1942–2021), Belgian sports administrator, 8th President of the International Olympic Committee
Johan Randulf Rogge (1859–?), Norwegian politician
Klaus Rogge (born 1979), German rower
Kort Rogge (c.1425–1501), Swedish bishop
Leslie Isben Rogge (born 1940), American bank robber
Michael Rogge (born 1929), Dutch photographer, videographer and filmmaker
Naomi Rogge (born 1999), American ice hockey forward
O. John Rogge (1903–1981), U.S. attorney
Rudolf Klein-Rogge (1885–1955), German film actor
Tim Rogge (born 1977), Belgian middle-distance runner

References

Dutch-language surnames
German-language surnames
Occupational surnames